Somatina macroanthophilata is a moth of the family Geometridae. It is found in China.

References

Moths described in 1992
Scopulini